Gary Weech Goodman (born 6 December 1953 in Sydney, New South Wales) is a former cricketer who played for Tasmania and South Australia.

Goodman was a right-handed batsman and occasional off-break bowler who represented Tasmania from 1978 until 1980, before playing for South Australia from 1980 to 1983 and returning to play for Tasmania until 1992–93, playing his last representative match for Tasmania at age 39. He commenced his cricket career with the strong St George Cricket Club in Sydney at the age of 16, winning the prestigious Junior Cricketer of the Year Award for four consecutive seasons. He also played in 23 Grand Finals winning 18 of the 23 with various cricket Clubs (Sth. Hurstville RSL CC, St George DCC, Petersham Marrickville DCC, Burnie CC, Devonport CC, Launceston CC, Newtown CC, Sunderland CC (UK), Brighouse CC (UK), Darlington CC (UK), Uddingston CC (Scot), Yorkshire 2nd XI, Leicestershire 2nd XI) and spanning a career from 1966 to 1992–93.

He was famous for scoring a century in his very first match for Tasmania against Queensland at the Gabba in 1978 and a successful team member of the first Tasmanian Cricket Team to win a National Title in the Gillette Cup, and was seen as a potential Australian player. However, after a few inconsistent performances with both the bat and the ball and a serious head injury in 1985, he was overlooked for Test selection. His flashes of brilliance with an electrifying 123 runs against the formidable West Indies attack in 1985 were compounded by his disappointing batting average; only 28 runs per innings for an opening batsman. This didn't cut it for Australian selection, even if he had the ability to score the odd century and the odd half century every 4th innings. His academic (MEd, BEd Dip Teach) and sport administration skills (AAMI, MAICD) saw senior administration and teaching roles with the Australian Sports Commission; New South Wales, Tasmanian and South Australian Education systems; CEO of the Tasmanian and Australian Capital Territory Cricket Associations where he was instrumental in developing with the Australian Football League the new and picturesque Manuka Oval and new Sir Donald Bradman Stand. He also played a major role as National Director of the powerful valuation and lobby group, The Australian Property Institute(2001–2002)and as National Project Manager for MAXIhomes Australia (2003–2005).

Goodman is currently Development Officer, Senior Teacher of Health and Physical Education and Master in Charge of Senior Cricket and Senior Coach of the Associated Southern Colleges First XI Premiership Cricket Team at historic Marist College Canberra, ACT Australia and Head Cricket Coach of the historic Eastlake Cricket Club in the ACT Grade competition.

See also
 List of Tasmanian representative cricketers

Australian cricketers
South Australia cricketers
Tasmania cricketers
1953 births
Living people
Cricketers from Sydney